Andrew Lee Fleming (born 18 February 1989) is an English retired footballer who played as a midfielder. Having begun his career with Wrexham, he is best known for his association with Morecambe, where he made over 200 appearances in League Two between 2010 and his retirement due to injury in 2019.

Club career

Wrexham
Fleming made his debut for Wrexham as a substitute for Steve Evans on 21 January 2007 during a 1–1 draw with Darlington in League Two and made his first start on 18 February in a 0–0 draw with Chester City. During the 2008–09 season, under new manager Dean Saunders Fleming managed to claim a regular place in the first team and was rewarded with a contract extension.

Morecambe
Out of contract at the end of the 2009–10 season, Fleming left Wrexham to sign for Morecambe on 27 July 2010. He made his debut for the club in a 2–0 win over Coventry City in the Football League Cup, scoring both goals,

In July 2019, Fleming announced his retirement as a player, aged 31, due to a knee injury.

International career

In May 2009, Fleming made his debut for the England C team in the 2007–09 International Challenge Trophy final, a 1–0 defeat against Belgium U21s.
He played again on 26 May 2010, scoring once in the 2009–11 International Challenge Trophy match versus the Republic of Ireland, which they won 2–1.

Career statistics

Club

References

External links
 

1989 births
Living people
English footballers
Wrexham A.F.C. players
Morecambe F.C. players
English Football League players
National League (English football) players
England semi-pro international footballers
Footballers from Liverpool
Association football midfielders